The 2014 Sacred Heart Pioneers football team represented Sacred Heart University in the 2014 NCAA Division I FCS football season. They were led by second-year head coach Mark Nofri. They played their home games at Campus Field. They were a member of the Northeast Conference (NEC). They finished the season 9–3 overall and 5–1 in NEC play to share the conference championship with Wagner. They received the NEC's automatic bid to the FCS Playoffs, where they lost in the first round to Fordham.

Schedule

References

Sacred Heart
Sacred Heart Pioneers football seasons
Northeast Conference football champion seasons
Sacred Heart
Sacred Heart Pioneers football